The buckingham (symbol: B) is a CGS unit of electric quadrupole, named in honour of the chemical physicist A. David Buckingham who was the first to measure a molecular quadrupole moment. This is equivalent to 1 debye-ångström, where 1 debye =  is the CGS unit of molecular dipole moment and 1 ångström = . 

One buckingham corresponds to the quadrupole moment resulting from two opposing dipole moments of equal magnitude of 1 debye that are separated by a distance of 1 ångström, a typical bond length. This is analogous to the debye for the dipole moment of two opposing charges of  separated by 1 ångström, and the name Buckingham for the unit was suggested by Peter Debye in 1963 in honour of Buckingham.

References

Non-SI metric units
Units of measurement